Libor Radimec (born 23 May 1950) is a Czech former football defender.

He played for Czechoslovakia, and was a participant in the 1982 FIFA World Cup. He also competed for Czechoslovakia at the 1980 Summer Olympics, where the team won the gold medals.

In his country he played for Baník Ostrava, for which he played 212 league matches and scored 20 league goals. He contributed to the best period in the history of the club. During his years as a player of the club, Baník won the Czechoslovak First League in 1976, 1980 and 1981. Baník also won the Czechoslovak Cup in 1978.

References

1950 births
Living people
Czech footballers
Czechoslovak footballers
Association football defenders
Footballers at the 1980 Summer Olympics
Olympic footballers of Czechoslovakia
Olympic gold medalists for Czechoslovakia
1982 FIFA World Cup players
FC Baník Ostrava players
MFK Vítkovice players
Czechoslovakia international footballers
Sportspeople from Ostrava
Olympic medalists in football
Czechoslovak expatriate footballers
Czechoslovak expatriate sportspeople in Austria
Expatriate footballers in Austria
Medalists at the 1980 Summer Olympics
First Vienna FC players
FK Austria Wien players